The 1974 DFB-Pokal Final decided the winner of the 1973–74 DFB-Pokal, the 31st season of Germany's knockout football cup competition. It was played on 17 August 1974 at the Rheinstadion in Düsseldorf. Eintracht Frankfurt won the match 3–1 against Hamburger SV after extra time, to claim their 1st cup title.

Route to the final
The DFB-Pokal began with 32 teams in a single-elimination knockout cup competition. There were a total of four rounds leading up to the final. Teams were drawn against each other, and the winner after 90 minutes would advance. If still tied, 30 minutes of extra time was played. If the score was still level, a replay would take place at the original away team's stadium. If still level after 90 minutes, 30 minutes of extra time was played. If the score was still level, a penalty shoot-out was used to determine the winner.

Note: In all results below, the score of the finalist is given first (H: home; A: away).

Match

Details

References

External links
 Match report at kicker.de 
 Match report at WorldFootball.net
 Match report at Fussballdaten.de 

Hamburger SV matches
Eintracht Frankfurt matches
1973–74 in German football cups
1974
Sports competitions in Düsseldorf
August 1974 sports events in Europe
1970s in Düsseldorf